Charles D. Seeberger (May 14, 1857 – September 13, 1931) was an American inventor.
In 1899, he joined the Otis Elevator Company.  The Seeberger-Otis partnership produced the first step-type escalator made for public use, and it was installed at the Paris Exhibition of 1900, where it won first prize. Mr. Seeberger eventually sold his patent rights to Otis in 1910.

External links
 Biography at National Inventors Hall of Fame

1857 births
1931 deaths
20th-century American inventors
Otis Worldwide
People from Oskaloosa, Iowa